The 2013 Idol Star Athletics – Archery Championship (Hangul: 아이돌 스타 육상 양궁 선수권 대회) was held at Goyang Gymnasium in Goyang, South Korea on January 28, 2013 and was broadcast on MBC on February 11, 2013 (a small part was broadcast on February 20, 2013). At the championships a total number of 8 events in athletics and 2 events in archery were contested: 5 by men, 4 by women and 1 mixed. There were a total number of 150 participating K-pop singers and celebrities, divided into 10 teams.

Results

Men

Athletics

Archery

Women

Athletics

Archery

Mixed

Athletics

Ratings

References

External links
2013 Idol Star Athletics-Archery Championship official MBC website 

MBC TV original programming
South Korean variety television shows
South Korean game shows
2013 in South Korean television
Idol Star Athletics Championships